There are several rivers named Palmital River in Brazil:

 Palmital River (Goiás)
 Palmital River (Paraná)
 Palmital River (Pardo River tributary)
 Palmital River (Santa Catarina)

See also
 Palmital (disambiguation)